The following is a list of current and former broadcasters for NASCAR on Fox.

Current commentators

NASCAR Cup Series
Fox's 2023 lineup of broadcasters for the Cup Series is as follows:

Booth announcers
 Mike Joy (play-by-play)
 Clint Bowyer (color commentator)
 Rotation of guest color commentators (see full list below)
 Tony Stewart (Clash, Duel races, Daytona 500, Fontana, Atlanta, Bristol dirt, Talladega and Charlotte)
 Danica Patrick (Las Vegas and Phoenix)
 Kurt Busch (COTA)
 Guenther Steiner (COTA)
 TBA (all races from Richmond through Sonoma)

Technical analyst (Charlotte studio)
 Larry McReynolds (all races except the Clash and the Duel races)

Pit reporters
 Jamie Little (all races)
 Regan Smith (all races)
 Larry McReynolds (Clash and Duel races only)
 Josh Sims (Duel races and Daytona 500 only)

Pre-race show (at track)
 Chris Myers (host)
 Clint Bowyer (analyst)
 Guest color commentator for the race, see full list above (analyst)
 Jamie McMurray (analyst)
 Michael Waltrip (gridwalk)
 Tom Rinaldi (guest reporter, Daytona 500 only)

Notes:
 Myers only did the Daytona 500 in 2019 and 2020 before returning full-time at every race in 2021, which he previously did from 2001 to 2018.
 Rinaldi also guest reported on the Daytona 500 pre-race shows in 2021 and 2022.
 Bryson Byrnes, an intern for NASCAR on Fox who is the son of deceased Fox pit reporter Steve Byrnes, is expected to guest report on the pre-race show gridwalk for the last Cup Series race on Fox's schedule (Sonoma in 2023) as he does each year which is when the Byrnsie Award (in honor of his father) is presented.

Pre-race show (Charlotte studio)
 Shannon Spake (host)
 Adam Alexander (additional host for the Clash only)
 Larry McReynolds (analyst)
 Trevor Bayne (analyst, Daytona 500)
 Bobby Labonte (analyst, Daytona 500)

Notes:
 McMurray also sporadically appears during the broadcast of each race as an in-race analyst from the NASCAR on Fox studio in Charlotte. Michael Waltrip had done this in past years before McMurray joined Fox (although Waltrip would be at the track in the studio with Chris Myers).
 The Charlotte studio was not used during the race weekend for the 2022 and 2023 Clash races. The pre-race show broadcasters (Spake, McReynolds and McMurray) went to the Los Angeles Memorial Coliseum in-person instead of broadcasting from the Charlotte studio. Additionally, McMurray went to the track for the Daytona 500 and McReynolds went to Daytona for the Duel races before returning to Charlotte for the rest of the race weekend.

NASCAR Xfinity Series
Fox's 2023 lineup of broadcasters for the Xfinity Series is as follows:

Booth announcers
 Adam Alexander (play-by-play)
 Michael Waltrip (color commentator, qualifying sessions only)
 Rotation of drivers and crew chiefs (color commentator, see full list below)
 Ryan Blaney (Daytona, Fontana and Las Vegas)
 Austin Dillon (Daytona)
 Coleman Pressley (in-race spotter analyst at Daytona, Phoenix, Atlanta and other races TBA)
 Joey Logano (Fontana, Phoenix and Atlanta)
 Kevin Harvick (Las Vegas, Phoenix and Richmond)
 Daniel Suárez (Atlanta)
 TBA (all races from COTA through Sonoma)

Pit reporters
 Jamie Little (select races TBA)
 Josh Sims (all races)
 Regan Smith (Daytona, Fontana, Las Vegas, Phoenix, Atlanta and other races TBA)

Pre-race show (Charlotte studio)
 Shannon Spake (host)
 Trevor Bayne (analyst)
 Larry McReynolds (analyst)

NASCAR Craftsman Truck Series
Fox's 2023 lineup of broadcasters for the Truck Series is as follows:

Booth announcers
 Adam Alexander (rotating play-by-play, Daytona and other races TBA)
 Jamie Little (rotating play-by-play, Las Vegas, Atlanta and other races TBA)
 Phil Parsons (color commentator, most races)
 Michael Waltrip (color commentator)
 Rotation of drivers (select races, color commentator, see full list below)
 Kevin Harvick - color commentator (COTA, Kansas and Gateway)

Pit reporters
 Amanda Busick (Daytona and Atlanta)
 Jamie Howe (Daytona, Las Vegas and Atlanta)
 Josh Sims (Las Vegas)
 Regan Smith (Daytona)

Pre-race show (Charlotte studio)
 Kaitlyn Vincie (host)
 Trevor Bayne (analyst)
 Todd Bodine (analyst)

ARCA Menards Series
Fox's 2023 ARCA Series broadcaster lineup is as follows:

Booth announcers
 Jamie Little (play-by-play)
 Phil Parsons (color commentator)
 Rotation of drivers (most races, color commentator, see full list below)
 Austin Cindric (Daytona and Phoenix)
 TBA (all other races)

Pit reporters
 Heather DeBeaux (Daytona and Phoenix)
 Jamie Howe (Daytona)
 Josh Sims (Phoenix)

Spanish language (Fox Deportes)
 Tony Rivera (play-by-play)
 Jessi Losada (color commentator)
 Giselle Zarur (pit reporter)

Other commentators/NASCAR Race Hub analysts
 Trevor Bayne (studio analyst)
 Jeff Hammond (studio analyst)
 Bobby Labonte (studio analyst)
 Andy Petree (studio analyst)
 David Ragan (studio analyst)
 Josh Sims (reporter and alternate Race Hub host)
 Bob Pockrass (social media)

Former commentators
This is a list of former NASCAR on Fox broadcasters, their position(s), and the years they were each with the network.
 Mark Garrow (substitute play-by-play or pit reporter for some standalone Xfinity Series races, 2001–06)
 Glenn Jarrett (substitute pit reporter for some standalone Xfinity Series races)
 Chad Little (substitute color commentator for some standalone Xfinity Series races, 2002–06)
 Rick Mast (substitute color commentator or pit reporter for some standalone Xfinity Series races)
 Randy LaJoie (substitute)
 Hank Parker Jr. (substitute color commentator for some Xfinity Series standalone races, 2003–06)
 Rick Allen (Truck and ARCA Series play-by-play 2003–14; substitute Xfinity Series play-by-play for some standalone races only, 2003–06). Left to become the play-by-play for Cup and Xfinity Series for NASCAR on NBC.)
 Steve Byrnes (2001–2015) Pit reporter (died April 21, 2015 from cancer)
 Jeanne Zelasko (2001–2006) Pit reporter (currently works for Bally Sports covering the Los Angeles Clippers)
 Dick Berggren (2001–2012) Pit reporter (retired from broadcasting after 2012 season)
 Krista Voda (2007–2014) Left to become the studio host for NASCAR on NBC and was in that job from 2015 to 2020. In 2022, she was the play-by-play for the ARCA Menards Series on MAVTV.
 Erin Andrews (guest pre-race reporter, 2013 Daytona 500 only)
 Brian Till (2015, fill-in/alternate Truck Series play-by-play) Now works for NBC as a pit reporter and alternate play-by-play for IMSA. 
 Ralph Sheheen (2015, fill-in/alternate Truck Series play-by-play) 
 Danielle Trotta (2010–2016) Took a year off from broadcasting in 2017, returned to broadcasting in 2018 on NBC Sports Boston and returned to covering NASCAR on NASCAR on NBC in 2019 as host of the NASCAR Victory Lap post-race show. She still covers the sport working for Sirius XM NASCAR Radio.
 Ray Dunlap (2003–2016, pit reporter for the Truck and ARCA Series and some standalone Xfinity races)
 Andrew Doud (2015–2016, Studio analyst/NASCAR Race Hub)
 Chris Neville (2015–2017, Cup, Xfinity and Truck Series pit reporter)
 John Roberts (2014–2018) Truck Series pre and post-race show host, also hosted NASCAR RaceDay on NASCAR on Speed (retired from broadcasting after 2018 season).
 Kenny Wallace (2007–2018) Select pre and post-race shows, Truck Series pit reporter at Eldora, also hosted NASCAR RaceDay on NASCAR on Speed (retired from broadcasting after 2018 season). He returned to Fox as a guest color commentator for 1 stage of the Cup Series race at Gateway in 2022.
 Jim Tretow (pit reporter for ARCA only) Still works for MAVTV as a color commentator for ARCA.
 Kevin Lee (2017–2018, play-by-play for ARCA only). Now works for NASCAR on NBC as a substitute pit reporter for standalone Xfinity Series races, a pit reporter for IndyCar races on NBC, and a play-by-play for IMSA sports car races on NBC.
 Kim Coon (2019, pit reporter for ARCA only). Still works for NASCAR.com and Motor Racing Network and became a pit reporter for NASCAR on NBC in 2022.
 Dillon Welch (2019, pit reporter for ARCA only). Now works as a pit reporter for NASCAR on NBC.
 Hermie Sadler (2011–2019) Truck Series pit reporter
 Sara Walsh (2019) Rotating/alternate NASCAR Race Hub host. She still works for Fox on their NFL coverage.
 Darrell Waltrip (2001–2019) Color commentator (retired from broadcasting after 2019 season). He returned to Fox as a guest color commentator for the Bristol dirt race in 2022.
 Lindsay Czarniak (2019–2020) Rotating/alternate NASCAR Race Hub host. Now works for CBS in the summer as the studio host for the Superstar Racing Experience and for NBC for the Olympics. She still works for Fox in the fall on their NFL coverage.
 Ricky Craven (2019–2020) Studio analyst/NASCAR Race Hub (retired from broadcasting after 2020 season)
 Alan Cavanna (2015–2020) Truck Series pit reporter
 Dave Rieff (2019–2020) Play-by-play for ARCA only
 Matt Yocum (2001–2020) Cup, Xfinity and Truck Series pit reporter. In 2021 and 2022, he worked for CBS as a pit reporter for the Superstar Racing Experience.
 Michael Strahan (guest pre-race reporter, 2021 Daytona 500 only)
 Jeff Gordon (2016–2021) Cup Series color commentator. Gordon left Fox after the 2021 season to work full-time at Hendrick Motorsports although he returned to Fox as a guest color commentator for the race at Atlanta in March 2022.
 Vince Welch (2015–2022) Cup and Xfinity Series pit reporter and Truck Series play-by-play
 Katie Osborne (2020–2022) ARCA pit reporter and Truck Series pit reporter at Pocono in 2021. She continues to work for NBC as a reporter for Mecum Auctions.

Previous guest analysts

Drivers (or crew chief in the case of Chad Knaus and Drew Blickensderfer) have appeared as rotating guest analysts for the Xfinity, Truck and/or the ARCA Menards Series broadcasts, and usually the same drivers return each year on top of a few that are added into the rotation each year. The new guest analysts in 2021 were Blickensderfer, Trevor Bayne, Greg Biffle, Chase Briscoe, Matt DiBenedetto, Brandon Jones, Andy Lally, Tyler Reddick, Tony Stewart, Kevin Swindell, and Daniel Suárez. Guest analysts that returned in 2021 from 2020 were Aric Almirola, Ryan Blaney, Kurt Busch, Matt Crafton, Austin Dillon, Joey Logano, and Bubba Wallace. Brad Keselowski, who had last appeared as a guest analyst in 2019, returned in 2021. Kyle Busch was the only driver to appear as a guest analyst on a 2020 broadcast that did not return for any races in 2021.

Numerous other drivers have appeared as guest analysts in years prior to 2020. In addition, Jeff Gordon, Jamie McMurray and Clint Bowyer were guest analysts before they became permanent analysts for Fox after their retirements from driving in NASCAR. Dale Earnhardt Jr. was also a guest analyst for Fox before he became a permanent analyst for NBC after he retired from driving in NASCAR full-time.

Drivers Only (+ Chad) broadcasts
Each year since 2017 (except for 2020 due to the COVID-19 pandemic), Fox has had active Cup Series drivers (plus crew chief Chad Knaus in 2019 and 2021) serve as every member of the broadcast team for one of their Xfinity Series races (Pocono in 2017, Talladega in 2018, and Charlotte in 2019, 2021 and 2022).

In 2021, Kevin Harvick, Ryan Blaney and Joey Logano were in the booth, Christopher Bell and Erik Jones were the pit reporters, and Brad Keselowski, Knaus, and Ricky Stenhouse Jr. were in the Charlotte studio. In 2022, the "Drivers Only" broadcast returned at the same race with the same three drivers in the booth and the return of Keselowski and Stenhouse to the studio. Austin Cindric and Tyler Reddick were the pit reporters, replacing Christopher Bell and Erik Jones, and Aric Almirola replaced Chad Knaus in the studio.

See also
 List of NASCAR on NBC broadcasters

References

External links

NASCAR on FOX broadcasters
NASCAR on FOX broadcasters
FOX